Michener may refer to:

People with the surname
Charles Duncan Michener (1918–2015), American entomologist
Earl C. Michener (1876–1957), American politician
Edward Michener (1869–1947), Canadian politician
James A. Michener (1907–1997), American novelist
Louis T. Michener (1848-1828), American politician
Norah Michener (1902–1987), doctorate in philosophy and wife of Roland Michener
Roland Michener (1900–1991), Governor General of Canada from 1967 to 1974

Places
James A. Michener Art Museum, Art Museum in Doylestown, Pennsylvania
Michener Center for Writers
Mount Michener, named after Roland Michener
The Michener Institute, a health education institute in Toronto

Other uses
James A. Michener's Texas, a 1994 movie
Lang Michener, a Canadian law firm
Michener Award, a journalism award founded by Roland Michener
Michener-Copernicus Fellowship, a literary fellowship